Ryan Cummins (born 14 April 1984) is an English cricketer, who represented Leicestershire County Cricket Club. He was born in Sutton, London.

Ryan's junior cricket was played at Beddington Cricket Club where he played at all levels and he does still play for Beddington when released by Leicestershire. He also played in junior age groups for Surrey County Cricket Club and for his high school (Wallington County Grammar School).

Cummins is a right-arm fast bowler who joined Leicestershire from Loughborough UCCE. His highlight was an appearance in the T/20 finals of the 2006 season bowling 3 overs for 40 runs but taking a fine catch.

He struggled to hold down a place in the Leicestershire team and was released at the end of the 2008 season after injury issues. He joined Northamptonshire in the winter of 2008 before being released next season due to a career ending injury to his back.

References

External links

Northants Cricket Page

Leicestershire cricketers
Northamptonshire cricketers
1984 births
Living people
Alumni of Loughborough University
People educated at Wallington County Grammar School
English cricketers
Loughborough MCCU cricketers